Balanoptica is a genus of moths of the family Yponomeutidae.

Species
Balanoptica orbicularis - Felder & Rogenhofer, 1875 

Yponomeutidae